The Verhuurdersheffing is a Dutch tax on public housing. The tax caused a reduction of 100.000 public houses and prevented the construction of another 100.000. The tax cost renters 1.7 billion euros.

The tax was implemented under the Rutte II cabinet under the guise of “deregulation”.

References 

Property taxes